Norman Quentin Cook (born Quentin Leo Cook, 16 July 1963), also known by his stage name Fatboy Slim, is an English musician, DJ, and record producer who helped to popularise the big beat genre in the 1990s. In the 1980s, Cook was the bassist for the Hull-based indie rock band the Housemartins, who achieved a UK number-one single with their a cappella cover of "Caravan of Love". After the Housemartins split up, Cook formed the electronic band Beats International in Brighton, who produced the number-one single "Dub Be Good to Me". He then played in Freak Power, Pizzaman, and the Mighty Dub Katz with moderate success.

In 1996, Cook adopted the name Fatboy Slim and released Better Living Through Chemistry to critical acclaim. Follow-up albums You've Come a Long Way, Baby, Halfway Between the Gutter and the Stars, and Palookaville, as well as singles such as "The Rockafeller Skank", "Praise You", "Right Here, Right Now", "Weapon of Choice", and "Wonderful Night", achieved commercial and critical success. In 2008, Cook formed the Brighton Port Authority, a collaborative effort with a number of other established artists including David Byrne. He has been responsible for successful remixes for Cornershop, the Beastie Boys, A Tribe Called Quest, Groove Armada, and Wildchild.

Cook holds the Guinness World Record for most top-40 hits under different names.  As a solo act, he has won nine MTV Video Music Awards and two Brit Awards.

Life and career

1963–1984: Early life and career beginnings 

Cook was born in Bromley, Kent. He was raised in Reigate, Surrey, and educated at Reigate Grammar School, where he took violin lessons alongside future Labour Party leader Keir Starmer.

He grew up with a love of music. When he was 14, his brother brought home the first album from the punk band The Damned, which turned him onto that genre; he started attending gigs at the Greyhound pub in Croydon and playing in punk bands. He played drums in Disque Attack, a British new wave-influenced rock band. When frontman Charlie Alcock was told by his parents that he had to give up the band to concentrate on his O levels, Cook took over as lead vocalist. At The Railway Tavern in Reigate, Cook met Paul Heaton, with whom he formed the Stomping Pondfrogs.

At 18, Cook went to Brighton Polytechnic to read a B.A. in English, politics, and sociology, where he achieved a 2:1 in British Studies. He had begun DJing some years before, but it was at this time that he began to develop his skills in the thriving Brighton club scene, regularly appearing at the Brighton Belle and  student favourite The Basement, where (then known as DJ Quentox) he began laying the base for Brighton's hip-hop scene.

1985–1995: The Housemartins to The Mighty Dub Katz 
In 1985, Heaton formed a guitar band called the Housemartins. Their bassist left on the eve of their first national tour, so Cook agreed to move to Hull to join them. The band soon had a hit single, "Happy Hour", and their two albums, London 0 Hull 4 and The People Who Grinned Themselves to Death, peaked in the Top 10 of the UK Albums Chart. They also reached number one just before Christmas 1986 with a version of "Caravan of Love", originally a hit the year before for Isley-Jasper-Isley. By 1988 they split up. Heaton and the band's drummer Dave Hemingway went on to form The Beautiful South, while Cook moved back to Brighton to pursue his interest in the style of music he preferred. He started working with young studio engineer Simon Thornton, with whom he continues to make records. All of Cook's records since have involved both of them to varying degrees (Thornton is credited in 2004 as "Executive Producer", for example).

Cook achieved his first solo hit in 1989, "Blame It on the Bassline", featuring future Beats International member MC Wildski. Credited to "Norman Cook feat. MC Wildski", the song followed the basic template of what would become Beats International's style. It was a modest hit on the UK Singles Chart, reaching number 29.

Cook formed Beats International, a loose confederation of studio musicians including vocalists Lindy Layton and Lester Noel, rappers D.J. Baptiste and MC Wildski, and keyboardist Andy Boucher. Their first album, Let Them Eat Bingo, included the number one single "Dub Be Good to Me", which caused a legal dispute over allegations of copyright infringement through the liberal use of unauthorised samples: the bassline was lifted note for note from The Clash's "The Guns of Brixton" and the lyrics borrowed heavily from The S.O.S. Band's "Just Be Good to Me". Cook lost the case and was ordered to pay back twice the royalties made on the record, bankrupting him. The 1991 follow-up album Excursion on the Version, an exploration of dub and reggae music, failed to duplicate its predecessor's success as it did not chart.

Cook then formed Freak Power with horn player Ashley Slater and singer Jesse Graham. They released their debut album Drive-Thru Booty in 1994, which contained the single "Turn On, Tune In, Cop Out". Levi's used the song in a multimillion-dollar advertising campaign. In 1996, Cook rejoined Freak Power for their second album, More of Everything for Everybody.

Cook enlisted help from producer friends Tim Jeffery and JC Reid to create a house music album as Pizzaman. The 1995 Pizzamania album spawned three UK Top 40 hits: "Trippin' on Sunshine", "Sex on the Streets", and "Happiness". Del Monte Foods corporation used "Happiness" in a UK fruit juice ad. The videos for the three singles were directed by Michael Dominic.

Cook also formed the group The Mighty Dub Katz with Gareth Hansome (aka GMoney), his former flatmate. Together they started the Boutique Nightclub in Brighton, formerly known as the Big Beat Boutique. Their biggest song together was "Magic Carpet Ride".

1996–2008: Fatboy Slim 

Cook adopted a quasi-blues-style pseudonym Fatboy Slim in 1996. Cook said of the name: "It doesn't mean anything. I've told so many different lies over the years about it I can't actually remember the truth. It's just an oxymoron—a word that can't exist.  It kind of suits me—it's kind of goofy and ironic."

The Fatboy Slim album and Cook's second solo album, Better Living Through Chemistry (released on Skint Records in the UK and Astralwerks in the US), contained the Top 40 UK hit "Everybody Needs a 303". Fatboy Slim's next work was the single "The Rockafeller Skank", released before the album You've Come a Long Way, Baby, both of which were released in 1998. "Praise You", also from this album, was Cook's first UK solo number one. Its music video, starring Spike Jonze, won numerous awards. On 9 September 1999, he performed "Praise You" at the 1999 MTV Video Music Awards in New York City, and won three awards, including the award for Breakthrough Video.

In 2000, Fatboy Slim released his third studio album Halfway Between the Gutter and the Stars and featured two collaborations with Macy Gray and the track "Weapon of Choice", which also was made into an award-winning music video starring Christopher Walken. The album also included "Sunset (Bird of Prey)," whose socially significant video sampled the 1964 "Daisy Girl" campaign ad. At the 2001 MTV Video Music Awards in New York, Fatboy Slim won six awards for "Weapon of Choice", the most awards at the ceremony.

In 2003, he produced "Crazy Beat" and "Gene by Gene" from the Blur album Think Tank and in 2004, Palookaville was Cook's first studio album for four years.

Fatboy Slim's greatest hits album Why Try Harder was released on 19 June 2006. It consists of 18 tracks, including ten Top 40 singles, a couple of Number Ones, and two new tracks, "Champion Sound" and "That Old Pair of Jeans".

In 2006, Cook travelled to Cuba and wrote and produced two original Cuban crossover tracks for the album The Revolution Presents: Revolution, which was released by Studio ! K7 and Rapster Records in 2009. The tracks are "Shelter" (which featured longtime collaborator Lateef) and "Siente Mi Ritmo", featuring Cuba's female vocal group Sexto Sentido. The recordings took place at Cuba's EGREM Studios, home of the Buena Vista Social Club, and featured a band of young Cuban musicians, including Harold Lopez Nussa. Another track recorded during these sessions, "Guaguanco", was released separately under the Mighty Dub Katz moniker in 2006.

2008–2012: The Brighton Port Authority 
The Brighton Port Authority debuted in 2008 with a collaboration with David Byrne and Dizzee Rascal titled "Toe Jam", along with a video featuring nude dancers with censor bars on them, making pictures and words with them.

The soundtrack album for the TV series Heroes also includes the Brighton Port Authority's track "He's Frank (Slight Return)" (a cover of a song by The Monochrome Set), with Iggy Pop as vocalist. The video for this track features a near life-size puppet of Iggy Pop. An alternative club version was released under the title "He's Frank (Washing Up)", with the video featuring some footage of Iggy Pop acting and saying lyrics.

The band's debut album, I Think We're Gonna Need a Bigger Boat, is the first to be co-produced by Cook's longtime engineer Simon Thornton, who also sings on one track. The album was released 6 January 2009 exclusively at Amazon.com on CD, with downloadable format and other stores scheduled for a month later on 3 February 2009.

In 2010 Cook released a mix album titled The Legend Returns as a covermount album in the June 2010 issue of Mixmag. He returned as Fatboy Slim when performing at Ultra Music Festival in Miami in March 2012.

On 12 August 2012 he performed “Rockefeller Skank” and “Right Here, Right Now” at the 2012 Summer Olympics Closing Ceremony, and on 1 September 2012 Cook performed at Brighton Pride.

2013–present: Return of Fatboy Slim 

On 20 June 2013, Cook released his first charting Fatboy Slim single in seven years; "Eat, Sleep, Rave, Repeat" with Riva Starr and Beardyman. Supported by a remix from Scottish DJ Calvin Harris, the song topped the UK Dance Chart that year.

In 2015, Cook released a 15th anniversary edition of Halfway Between the Gutter and the Stars. This was supported with the release of miscellaneous remixes. In May 2015, Cook compiled The Fatboy Slim Collection, an album of songs used throughout his sets over the years.

In 2017, Fatboy Slim returned with his single "Where U Iz", released on 3 March. Later that year, he released another collaboration with Beardyman titled "Boom F**king Boom".

In 2018, a remix album from Australian artists of Cook's previous works was released, titled Fatboy Slim vs. Australia.

Other works 
Cook produced the single "Mama Do the Hump" by fellow Brighton band Rizzle Kicks released in December 2011 which peaked at number 2 in the charts.

Cook has been responsible for successful remixes for Cornershop, Beastie Boys, A Tribe Called Quest, and Wildchild. In 2008, he did a remix of the track "Amazonas" for the charity Bottletop.

Performances 

On 13 July 2002, Fatboy Slim played at the second of his free open-air concerts on Brighton Beach, the Big Beach Boutique II. Although organisers expected a crowd of around 60,000 people, the event instead attracted an estimated 250,000 who crammed the promenade and beach between Brighton's piers. Local police forced the event to end early amid safety concerns due to overcrowding. Shortly after the event there were two deaths, one due to a fall from the Upper Esaplanade and one from a heart attack. After the show finished, major traffic congestion ensued throughout the Brighton area, with many caught in traffic jams until the morning.

In June 2005, Fatboy Slim filled the Friday night headline slot on the "Other Stage" at the Glastonbury Festival. In 2006, Fatboy Slim filled the Saturday headline slot at the Global Gathering festival at Long Marston Airfield in the English Midlands. He played a two-hour set, appearing in front of a visual stage set comprising video screens and 3D lighting. A fireworks display rounded off the show. Having been banned by police from playing in Brighton since 2002, Fatboy Slim was given permission in 2006 to play again in his home town. On 1 January 2007, he played to an audience of more than 20,000 fans along Brighton's seafront. Tickets to the event, titled "Fatboy Slim's Big Beach Boutique 3", were made available only to individuals with a BN postcode. The concert was deemed a "stunning success" by Sussex police, Fatboy Slim, and the crowd. The Cuban Brothers and David Guetta opened the concert. The next similar event, 'Big Beach Boutique 4', was held on 27 September 2008.

In 2008, Fatboy Slim played at the Glastonbury Festival again and headlined the O2 Wireless Festival and Rockness Festival. According to an NME interview, this may have been one of the last times he performed as Fatboy Slim, as he may now be focusing on his new band The Brighton Port Authority (BPA). Also in 2008, Fatboy Slim closed out the famed "Sahara" tent on Friday of the Coachella Valley Music Festival. His introduction included a Charlie and the Chocolate Factory opening that has been called by many one of the most memorable Sahara performances ever.

In 2009, he toured Australia in the Good Vibrations Festival. Also in 2009, he played in Marlay Park, Dublin alongside David Guetta, Dizzee Rascal, and Calvin Harris, as well as one huge performance at the Sziget Festival in Budapest. He also performed at V Festival 2009.

At Glastonbury 2009, he played an unadvertised concert in the "pinball-machine" stage at trash city.

In 2010, Fatboy Slim headlined the east dance at Glastonbury Festival. On 18 June 2010, he performed in Cape Town, South Africa as part of the Cool Britannia FIFA World Cup music festival at the Cape Town International Convention Centre. He also performed in Naples on 15 July at the Neapolis Festival. On 30 May 2011, he performed as the headliner for Detroit's Movement Electronic Music Festival in Detroit, Michigan. On 25 September 2011, Fatboy Slim headlined the Terrace at Ibiza's famed Space Nightclub's We Love Sundays closing party. On 29 October 2011, Fatboy Slim opened at the San Francisco Bill Graham Civic Auditorium, following up on the 30th, closing out the Red Bulletin/Le PLUR Stage at the Voodoo Music Experience in New Orleans, Louisiana. On Saturday, 24 March 2012, Fatboy Slim performed a live DJ set on the main stage at Ultra Music Festival in Miami, Florida. In addition to his other 2011 performances, Fatboy Slim also played a headline gig at the Bestival on the Isle of Wight on 11 September.

In March 2012, Cook hosted a one-hour radio programme, titled On The Road To Big Beach Bootique 5, on XFM. It consisted of 10 shows.

He performed his famous remix of "The Rockafeller Skank" (dubbed the 'Funk Soul Brother') at the closing ceremony for the 2012 Summer Olympics on top of a giant inflatable octopus, which emerged from the top of a party bus.

In 2013, Fatboy Slim played at Ultra Music Festival, Wavefront Music Festival, Exit Festival, Bestival, and Glastonbury Festival (as a special guest on the Wow! and Arcadia stages).

On 6 March 2013, Fatboy Slim played at the House of Commons in Westminster, London. This was the first time a DJ ever performed there, and the performance was in aid of the Last Night A DJ Saved My Life Foundation, which is aimed at "encouraging 16- to 25-year-olds to get more involved in their communities through grassroot initiatives and to raise awareness for community music projects".

In May 2014, Fatboy Slim played Coachella for a second time, again on the Sahara stage.

In December 2014, Fatboy Slim played three sold-out shows including The Warehouse Project in Manchester & O2 Brixton Academy, with supporting acts such as VAS LEON with Arthur Baker for Slam Dunk'd, and DJ Fresh.

On 15 May 2016 he played a private two-hour set "Baby Loves Disco" for preschool children and their parents during the festival Brighton Fringe holding.

At Glastonbury 2016, he played the John Peel stage for the first time.

In October 2019, Cook performed a mashup of his track "Right Here, Right Now" and Greta Thunberg's United Nations speech during a concert in Gateshead, England.

In May 2021, Cook performed at one of the first UK events in Liverpool, England as part of the government's trials to restart mass audience events.

In July 2022, Cook returned to Brighton beach for the 20th anniversary of Big Beach Boutique. He was joined by Carl Cox, Eats Everything, and others.

Legacy 
Known as DJ Quentox (The OX that Rocks), Cook and DJ Baptiste started putting on youth club hip hop jams in Brighton, sowing the seeds of the city's flourishing hip hop scene today. These primitive 1980s block parties are recalled in the music documentary South Coast, which documents Brighton's cult hip hop scene from its grass roots to the present day.
Cook was awarded a star on the city of Brighton's Walk of Fame, next to that of Winston Churchill.
Q magazine named Fatboy Slim part of their "50 Bands to See Before You Die" list.

Personal life 
He married TV personality Zoe Ball in 1999 at Babington House in Somerset. In January 2003, Cook broke up with Ball, but three months later they reconciled. They have a son, Woody Fred Cook (born 15 December 2000), who appeared on the Channel 4 show The Circle in 2019, and performs under the record label Truth Tribe, and a daughter Nelly May Lois (born 14 January 2010), who premiered a DJ set as Fat Girl Slim with Camp Bestival during the COVID-19 pandemic to raise money for the Ellen MacArthur Cancer Trust and The Trussell Trust.  They live in Western Esplanade, Portslade, Hove. On 24 September 2016, Cook and Ball announced their separation after 18 years.

Cook is a 12% shareholder of Brighton & Hove Albion, the football club he has supported since moving to Brighton in the late 1980s.

On 4 March 2009, Cook checked into a rehabilitation centre in Bournemouth to fight alcoholism. Due to an extended stay in the rehabilitation centre, his performance at Snowbombing, a week-long winter sports and music festival held in the Austrian ski resort of Mayrhofen, was cancelled, with the slot being filled by 2ManyDJs. Cook left the clinic at the end of March. As of 4 March 2019 he had not used drugs or alcohol for 10 years.

Aliases 
It was reported in 2008 that he held the Guinness World Record for the most Top 40 hits under different names.

Collaborations 
Bands
 The Housemartins (Bassist; 1985–1988)
 Rockaway Three (1988)
 Double Trouble (1988–1990)
 Beats International (1989–1992)
 Pizzaman (1993–1997)
 Freak Power (1993–1996)
 Fried Funk Food (1995)
 Mighty Dub Katz ("Magic Carpet Ride" dance song [1995] and "Work it, Work it")
 The Brighton Port Authority (2008–present)

Awards and nominations

Discography 

Studio albums
 Better Living Through Chemistry (1996)
 You've Come a Long Way, Baby (1998)
 Halfway Between the Gutter and the Stars (2000)
 Palookaville (2004)

Filmography 
Cook appears in the documentary Tripping (1999) directed by Vikram Jayanti and written by Jeff Taupler about Ken Kesey and the Merry Pranksters. He appears as himself in the 2019 satire film Greed.

References

External links 

 
 Norman Cook ... AKA Fatboy Slim
 
 
 

1963 births
Living people
Astralwerks artists
English electronic musicians
English record producers
Musicians from Brighton and Hove
DJs from Brighton and Hove
Musicians from London
DJs from London
English house musicians
English football chairmen and investors
People educated at Reigate Grammar School
Alumni of the University of Brighton
Breakbeat musicians
Brit Award winners
Grammy Award winners
MTV Europe Music Award winners
Ivor Novello Award winners
NME Awards winners
The Housemartins members
Remixers
People from Bromley
People from Hove
Big beat musicians